The Michigan Secretary of State election of 2014 took place on November 4, 2014, to elect the Secretary of State of Michigan. Incumbent Republican Secretary of State Ruth Johnson was re-elected to a second term in office with 53.53% of the vote.

Republican primary

Candidates

Declared
 Ruth Johnson, incumbent Secretary of State

Democratic primary

Candidates

Declared
 Godfrey Dillard, attorney and candidate for Michigan's 15th congressional district in 1996

Minor parties

Taxpayers Party
 Robert Gale, perennial candidate

Natural Law Party
 Jason Gatties, nominee for Michigan's 6th congressional district in 2012

Libertarian Party
 Jamie Lewis, nominee for the State Senate in 2006 and 2010

General election

Polling

Results

References

External links
Official campaign websites
 Ruth Johnson for Secretary of State
 Godfrey Dillard for Secretary of State (archived)

2014 Michigan elections
Michigan Secretary of State elections
November 2014 events in the United States
Michigan